This is a list of aircraft in alphabetical order beginning with 'Z'.

Z

ZAGI
(anglicised version of TsAGI Центра́льный аэрогидродинами́ческий институ́т (ЦАГИ) or Tsentralniy Aerogidrodinamicheskiy Institut, the Central Aerohydrodynamic Institute)
see:TsAGI

Zajicek 
(Charles A Zajicek, Berwyn, IL)
 Zajicek C-2
 Zajicek C-3
 Zajicek Sport

Zalazar
(Willam Nicolás Zalazar / Aer Quest)
 Zalazar Nova 21

Zalewski
(Władislaw Zalewski / Vladimir Fedorovich Savyelyev)
 Zalewski W.Z.I unfinished
 Zalewski W.Z.II glider
 Zalewski W.Z.III (a.k.a. Savyelyev-Zalewski S.Z. No.1) quadruplane
 Zalewski W.Z.IV (a.k.a. Savyelyev-Zalewski S.Z. No.2) quadruplane
 Zalewski W.Z.V (a.k.a. Savyelyev-Zalewski S.Z. No.3) quadruplane
 Zalewski W.Z.VI (4-engined quadruplane - abandoned due to revolution)
 Zalewski W.Z.VIII 'DePeŻe' - unbuilt
 Zalewski W.Z.X
 Zalewski W.Z.XI Kogutek I
 Zalewski W.Z.XII Kogutek II

Zaparka
(Eduard Zaparka)
 Zaparka experimental fighter

Zapata
(Franky Zapata)
 Zapata Flyboard Air

Zardins 
(Rudolfs Zardins)
 Zardins' Kristine
 Zardins' Vanadzins

Zaschka
(Engelbert Zaschka, Freiburg im Breisgau, Germany)
 Zaschka helicopter
 Zaschka Gyroplane
 Zaschka rotary wing system
 Zaschka human powered glider

Zea
(Antonio Zea, Mexico)
Zea EPT-1 Teziutlan

Zeferu
(Asmelash Zeferu, Ethiopia)
 Zeferu K-570

Zelinka
(Heinrich Zelinka)
 Zelinka experimental fighter

Zenair 
(Zenair Ltd. Midland, Ontario, Canada)
 Zenair Cricket -  Kit
 Zenair Zipper
 Zenair Zipper-RX
 Zenair Zipper II
 Zenair CH 50 Mini Z
 Zenair CH 100 Mono-Z
 Zenair CH 150 Acro-Z
 Zenair CH 180 Super Acro-Z
 Zenair CH 200
 Zenair CH 250
 Zenair CH 260 Gemini
 Zenair CH 300
 Zenair CH 300 Tri-Z
 Zenair CH 640
 Zenair CH 650
 Zenair CH 2000

Zenith 
(Zenith Aircraft Company, United States)
 Zenith CH 400
 Zenith CH 600
 Zenith CH 601
 Zenith CH 620 Gemini 
 Zenith STOL CH 701
 Zenith STOL CH 750
 Zenith STOL CH 801
 Zenith CH 2000 Alarus

Zenith 
(Zenith Aircraft Mfg. Co.)
 Zenith P-1
 Zenith Sport

Zenith 
(Zenith Aircraft Corporation)
 Zenith Albatross Z-12
 Zenith Albatross Z-6
 American Albatross B-1

Zenith
(Georges-Gendre)
 Zenith 1910 Monoplane

Zens
(Paul et Ernest Zens)	
 Zens 1908 Canard Biplane

Zeppelin-Friedrichshafen 
 for airship designs
 Zeppelin C.I
 Zeppelin C.II

Zeppelin-Lindau 
(Luftschiffbau Zeppelin, Germany)
 Zeppelin-Lindau CL.I
 Zeppelin-Lindau CL.II
 Zeppelin-Lindau CS.I
 Zeppelin-Lindau V1
 Zeppelin-Lindau D.I
 Zeppelin-Lindau Rs.I
 Zeppelin-Lindau Rs.II
 Zeppelin-Lindau Rs.III
 Zeppelin-Lindau Rs.IV
 Zeppelin-Lindau Rs.V (unbuilt)
 Zeppelin-Lindau R.I (unbuilt)

Zeppelin Luftschiffbau 
(Luftschiffbau Zeppelin, Germany)
 List of Zeppelins
 Zeppelin ZSO 523
 Zeppelin Rammer

Zeppelin-Staaken 
(Zeppelin Werke Staaken G.m.b.H.)
Zeppelin-Staaken VGO.I(RML.1) (VGO-Versuchsbau Gotha-Ost)
Zeppelin-Staaken VGO.II
Zeppelin-Staaken VGO.III
Zeppelin-Staaken R.IV
Zeppelin-Staaken R.V
Zeppelin-Staaken R.VI
Zeppelin-Staaken R.VII
Zeppelin-Staaken R.VIII
Zeppelin-Staaken R.IX
Zeppelin-Staaken R.XIV
Zeppelin-Staaken R.XV
Zeppelin-Staaken R.XVI
Zeppelin-Staaken Type "L"
Zeppelin-Staaken Type 8301
Zeppelin-Staaken Type 8307
Zeppelin-Staaken E.4/20
Zeppelin-Staaken Riesenflugzeuge

Zerbe 
(James Slough Zerbe, United States)
 Zerbe Air Sedan
 Zerbe Quintaplane
 Zerbe Sextuplane

ZeroAvia
 ZeroAvia M350

Zero Gravity Paragliders
(JM International Company Limited, Seoul, South Korea)
Zero Gravity Flow
Zero Gravity Windstar

Ziegler 
(Flugzeugwerke Johann Ziegler Vienna, Austria)
 Ziegler 1912 Biplane 
 Ziegler 1912 Monoplane

Ziegler 
 Ziegler (Potsdam) 1912 Monoplane

Ziegler
 Ziegler shoulder-wing monoplane
 Ziegler high-wing monoplane

Zielinski 
(Edward Zielinski)
 Zielinski 1930 Monoplane

ZIG 
(Zavod Imyennyi Goltsman – Works named for Goltsman)
 ZIG-1

Zilina
(Zilina Transport Research Institute)
 Zilina Vazka (autogyro)

Zimmerman 
(Charles Horton Zimmerman, United States)
 Zimmerman 1925 circular wing
 Zimmerman 1935 flying pancake

Zimmerman 
(Hugh E. Zimmerman)
 Zimmerman 1931 Biplane

Zivko 
((William & Judy) Zivko Aeronautics Inc, Guthrie, OK)
 Zivko Edge 540

Zlatoust Model Club
 Zlatoust Malysh

Zlín 
(Zlínská Letecká Akciová Spolecnost / Zlín Moravan Národní Podnik / Moravan Otrokovice, Czechoslovakia)
 Zlín Akrobat
 Zlín Trener
 Zlín Z XII
 Zlín Z 212
 Zlín Z XIII - (Bata fighter plane designed per Jan A. Bata's specifications 1937)
 Zlín Z 20
 Zlín Z 22 Junák
 Zlin Z 122
 Zlín Z 26 Trener / Akrobat
 Zlín Z 126
 Zlín Z 226
 Zlín Z 326
 Zlín Z 526
 Zlín Z 726
 Zlin Z-35 Heli-Trener
 Zlin Z-135 Heli-Trener
 Zlín Z 37 Čmelák (agro aircraft)
Zlín Z 137
 Zlin-Moravan Z-38
 Zlín Z 42
 Zlín Z 142
 Zlín Z 242
 Zlín Z 43
 Zlín Z 143
 Zlín Z 50
 Zlín Z 181 Bücker Bü 181 Licence
 Zlín Z 281 Bücker Bü 181 Licence
 Zlín Z 381 Bücker Bü 181 Licence
 Zlín Savage Classic
 Zlín Savage Cruiser
 Zlin Savage Cub
 Zlín Savage Bobber
 Zlín Savage Cub S

Zlokazov 
 Zlokazov ARK-Z-1

Zmaj
(Fabrika Aeroplana I Hidroplana Zmaj, Yugoslavia)
 Zmaj Fizir FN
 Zmaj Fizir FP-2
 Fizir FT Nastavni (also known as the Zmaj FP-2)
 Zmaj Fizir FT-1 Nebošja
 Zmaj R-1
 Zmaj Fizir F1M-Jupiter
 Zmaj Fizir-Loren (sic)
 Zmaj Fizir AF.2

Zodiac
(Societe Zodiac)
 Zodiac l'albatros 1910 monoplane
 Zodiac 1910 monoplane
 Zodiac 1911 Biplane (1)
 Zodiac 1911 Biplane S-2

Zodiac
(Zodiac Aircraft Corp / Zodiac Aerospace)
 Zodiac Libra-Det

Zornes 
(Charles A. Zornes)
 Zornes 1909 Biplane

ZRPSL 
(Aviation Equipment Repair and Production Works - Zakład Remontów I Produkcji Sprzẹtu Lotniczego)
 ZRPSL EM-10 Bielik
 ZRPSL EM-10 Fenix
 ZRPSL EM-11 Orca

Zuchenko
 Zhuchenko Vertoplan

Zuck-Whitaker 
((Daniel R) Zuck-(Stanley D) Whitaker, Los Angeles, CA)
 Zuck-Whitaker Plane-Mobile

Zurkowski 
 Zurkowski ZR.1

References

Further reading

External links

 List of aircraft (Z)